State Route 77 (SR 77) is a  north–south state highway in the eastern part of the U.S. state of Alabama.  The southern terminus of the highway is at an intersection with U.S. Route 431 (US 431) near LaFayette.  The northern terminus of the highway is at an intersection with US 431 just north of Attalla. North of Talladega, the highway passes the entrance to Talladega Superspeedway, home of the NASCAR Sprint Cup, Infinity Series, and Camping World Truck Series races that are held annually.

Route description
SR 77 begins in Ridgeville at US 431. It immediately crosses a railroad track and turns south, passing through a ridge cut, before junctioning with US 278. It enters Attalla and junctions with US 11. It turns east-to-west again and junctions with I-59 in Rainbow City. This junction is almost immediately below I-59's junction with I-759. It enters the main part of Rainbow City and junctions with US 411 and crosses the Coosa River. It crosses over multiple forks of the Coosa River as it enters Calhoun County.

It crosses more forks of the Coosa River as it nears Ohatchee. It junctions with SR 144 and leaves Ohatchee. It crosses into Talladega County.

It enters Lincoln, where it junctions with US 78. It continues south and junctions with I-20. It passes by the world-famous Talladega Superspeedway as it enters Talladega. It junctions with SR 34 and enters the city. Within the city, it junctions with SR 275 and SR 21. It turns northwest-southeast and enters the Talledega National Forest. It eventually enters Clay County.

It eventually leaves the National Forest and junctions with SR 130. It maintains an east-to-west path throughout this area. it enters Ashland and junctions with SR 9. There is a highly complex string of intersections in this city, including a point where SR 9 continues on SR 77's right-of-way and another point where the two routes parallel each other as they leave the city to the south. After a journey southeast to Meadow Valley, it junctions with SR 49. It maintains a concurrency with it as it enters the main part of Meadow Valley (the city). It continues on SR 49's right-of-way. It leaves the county near Sikesville. It enters Randolph County.

It maintains a short east-to-west path to SR 22 in Wadley. It maintains a concurrency with it until they reach Louina. SR 22 continues on SR 77's right-of-way. SR 77 turns south and enters Chambers County.

The route has no junctions with other routes of its kind as it makes the long journey south to La Fayette. It junctions with US 431 once again in the northern part of the city. This is SR 77's southern terminus.

This route is a minor route for travel between Gadsden and Auburn as a replacement for US 431.

History

The original route of SR 77 was established in 1940, traveling from LaFayette to Ashland. By 1961, the highway was extended to its current northern terminus in northwestern Etowah County. Until 1985, the segment of the highway between Talladega and Lincoln was concurrent with US 231 Alt.

The earlier routes that predated SR 77 in Talladega and Calhoun counties include the Gilbert's Ferry road and the Jackson Trace, which was used and named after General Andrew Jackson, who, with militia used this part of the route the defeat the Creek people at the Battle Of Horseshoe Bend.

Major intersections

See also

References

077
Transportation in Chambers County, Alabama
Transportation in Randolph County, Alabama
Transportation in Clay County, Alabama
Transportation in Talladega County, Alabama
Transportation in Calhoun County, Alabama
Transportation in Etowah County, Alabama